Instant Star is a Canadian musical comedy-drama television series which aired from 15 September 2004 to 26 June 2008. The series starred Alexz Johnson as teenage singing competition winner Jude Harrison. The show chronicles Harrison's experience in the recording industry whilst focusing on character development.

Linda Schuyler and Stephen Stohn of Epitome Pictures produced the show. The show began to air on CTV in Canada before being picked up by the American network Noggin for its teen-oriented block, The N. The show became the second most popular series on The N with Degrassi: The Next Generation, another show also produced by Schuyler and Stohn, ranking as most popular.

Four seasons of the show (each with 13 episodes) were produced. CTV and The N both pulled funding following the fourth season, and the executives chose to end the show. The fourth and final season ended on June 26, 2008 in the United States.

Overview
In each episode of the show, Jude Harrison must deal with the issues and challenges of both her musical career and her personal life, as one weaves into the other. She also faces dilemmas and choices in her relationships, dividing her feelings between the loves in her life, while also recording with G-Major Records. These people are important to her music – the one thread that ties her life together. Her best moments are when she is working with others in creating and performing her music. In addition to her music and her loves, there is much else going on in her personal life and in the lives of those around her.

Episodes

Cast

Main
 Alexz Johnson as Jude Harrison
 Kristopher Turner as Jamie Andrews 
 Tim Rozon as Tom Quincy
 Laura Vandervoort as Sadie Harrison
 Barbara Mamabolo as Kat Benton (season 1; recurring, season 2)
 Tracy Waterhouse as Georgia Bevans (season 1)
 Matthew Brown as Shay Mills (season 1)
 Andrea Lui as EJ Li (season 1)

 Wes Williams as Darius Mills

 Tyler Kyte as Vincent Spiederman (recurring, season 1; main, seasons 2–4)
 Cory Lee as Karma (seasons 3–4)
 Zoie Palmer as Patsy Sewer (recurring, season 2; main season 3)
 Mark Taylor as Kwest (recurring, seasons 1-2; main, seasons 3–4)
 Christopher Gaudet as Wally Robbins (recurring, seasons 1–2; main, seasons 3–4)
 Ian Blackwood as Kyle Bateman (recurring, season 2; main, seasons 3–4)
 Craig Warnock as Paegan Smith (season 4)
 Tatiana Maslany as Zeppelin (season 4)
 Cassie Steele as Blu (season 4)
 Kyle Riabko as Milo Keegan (season 4)

Recurring
 Katrina Matthews as Eden Taylor (season 1)
 Simon Reynolds as Stuart Harrison

Supporting

Guest stars

The Instant Stars

Music
Other article: Instant Star soundtracks

Each episode of the series features a new song performed by Alexz Johnson. Usually, the song is about something that occurs in the episode. However, in some episodes, there is no direct explanation to the lyrics; sometimes it's just a song. Some episodes can feature more than one song, but there is only one song per episode that is to be featured on the soundtrack for that season. For instance, there are 13 episodes per season, which means there are 13 main songs. One of the songs, "Perfect," was written by Canadian synth pop artist Lights.

Alexz Johnson recorded the vocals on the first and second soundtracks, while even co-writing some of the songs with her brother Brendan. For the third and fourth soundtracks, Alexz wasn't featured for all of the songs because of the release of her debut album and conflicts with prior record labels.

Just before the broadcast of the second season on The N, viewers had a chance to see Alexz Johnson in concert in a show called Instant Star: Backstage Pass, singing two of the songs from each season of the show and accompanied by her band from the show, Spiederman Mind Explosion.

Broadcast

Instant Star was broadcast in over 120 countries.

Home releases
Funimation Entertainment released the first two seasons on DVD in Region 1 in 2007.

Echo Bridge Home Entertainment acquired the rights to the series in 2010 and subsequently released the final two seasons on DVD, available in the US only.

Reception

In 2005, after its first season, Instant Star was nominated for three Gemini Awards in the category of Best Children's or Youth Fiction Program or Series. Nominations included: (1) Best Series; (2) Best Performance (Alexz Johnson); and (3) Best Direction (Graeme Campbell). The show won the award for Best Direction for the episode You Can't Always Get What You Want.

On August 28, 2007, the show received three more Gemini Award nominations in the category of Best Children's or Youth Program or series. Alexz Johnson was again nominated for Best Performance (for the episode, "I Fought the Law"), and there were two more nominations for Best Direction - Graeme Campbell (for "I Fought the Law"), and Pat Williams (for "Personality Crisis").

References

External links

 
 Instant Star On-set photo gallery @ TheGATE.ca

2000s Canadian comedy-drama television series
2000s Canadian music television series
2000s Canadian teen drama television series
2000s Canadian teen sitcoms
2004 Canadian television series debuts
2008 Canadian television series endings
CTV Television Network original programming
Television series about fictional musicians
Television series by DHX Media
Television series by Bell Media
English-language television shows
The N original programming
Serial drama television series
Funimation
Television series by Alliance Atlantis
Television series about teenagers